The Phalaena (Noctua) ochreago invalidly described by Esper in 1791 is Tiliacea citrago.

Xestia ochreago is a moth of the family Noctuidae.

Description
Xestia ochreago has a wingspan of 37–39 mm. The forewings are basically yellowish or pale brown, with transversal wavy dark brown lines and with yellowish rings surrounded by darker fine lines. At the lower rim of the kidney shaped ring there is a characteristic brownish stain. The hind wings are greyish or pale brown.

Biology
Adults are mainly day-active and are on wing from the end of June to August in one generation per year. Adults are found on flowers of Scabiosa, Adenostyles and Cirsium spinosissimum. The larvae feed on various plants, including Verbascum and Tussilago farfara. This species overwinters as a caterpillar.

Distribution and habitat
This species is found in the Mediterranean and Asia. In Europe it is found in the mountains of Spain, the mountains in the eastern Balkan and the Alps. It is found up to heights of 2,500 meters.

Bibliography
LepIndex: The Global Lepidoptera Names Index. Beccaloni G.W., Scoble M.J., Robinson G.S. & Pitkin B.
Michael Fibiger: Noctuinae II. In: W. G. Tremewan (Hrsg.): Noctuidae Europaeae. 1. Auflage. Band 2, Entomological Press, Sorø 1993, .
W. Forster, T. A. Wohlfahrt: Die Schmetterlinge Mitteleuropas, Band IV, Eulen. Franckh'sche Verlagshandlung, Stuttgart 1971
 Erstbeschreibung: HÜBNER, J. [1800-1838]: Sammlung europäischer Schmetterlinge 4: pl. 1-185

References

External links
Lepiforum e.V.
schmetterlinge-deutschlands.de

Xestia
Moths described in 1790
Moths of Asia
Moths of Europe
Taxa named by Jacob Hübner